Goffredo Cappa (1644–1717), also known as Gioffredo Cappa or Jofredus Cappa, was an Italian luthier, known for his violins and cellos.

Cappa was born in Saluzzo.  After working with the Amati family in Cremona he set up his own workshop in Saluzzo.  He died in Turin.

Contemporary players

 Meta Weiss plays a cello made in 1690
 Amiram Ganz from the Altenberg Trio plays a violin made in 1686
 Luca Fanfoni plays a violin made in 1694
 Geneviève Laurenceau plays a violin made in 1700
 Jean-Guihen Queyras plays a cello made in 1696
 Stéphane Grappelli played a violin made in 1695

References

1644 births
1717 deaths
Italian luthiers
People from Saluzzo